Cristóbal Tauler (born 19 October 1894, date of death unknown) was a Spanish sports shooter. He competed in the 50 m rifle event at the 1948 Summer Olympics.

References

1894 births
Year of death missing
Spanish male sport shooters
Olympic shooters of Spain
Shooters at the 1948 Summer Olympics
People from Garrotxa
Sportspeople from the Province of Girona
20th-century Spanish people